Livedo refers to a form of skin discoloration.

 Livedo reticularis
 Livedo racemosa
 Livedoid dermatitis
 Livedoid vasculitis

References

External links 

Dermatologic terminology